The EuroLeague is the highest level tier and most important professional club competition between basketball teams in Europe. It can contain teams from up to 18 different countries, from members of FIBA Europe, and mostly consisting of teams from ULEB member national domestic leagues.

The FIBA era statistical leaders of the competition range from 1958 to 2001, including the lone season of the FIBA SuproLeague competition. While the EuroLeague Commercial Assets (ECA) era statistical leaders of the competition range from 2000 to the present. There are also the overall historical statistical leaders of the EuroLeague, which are the stat leaders for all formats and organizing bodies of the league's history, since 1958.

EuroLeague career statistical leaders 2000–01 to present
The EuroLeague's career statistical leaders, since the competition has been organized by the EuroLeague Commercial Assets (ECA), starting with the 2000–01 season.

Bold indicates current club.

Games played

Last updated: March 17, 2023

Performance Index Rating (PIR)

Last updated: March 17, 2023

Points scored

Last updated: March 17, 2023

Total rebounds

Last updated: March 17, 2023

Assists

Last updated: March 17, 2023

Steals

Last updated: March 17, 2023

Blocks

Last updated: March 17, 2023

3 Pointers made

Last updated: March 17, 2023

EuroLeague career statistical leaders 1958 to 2001
The EuroLeague's career statistical leaders, from the 1958 FIBA European Champions Cup season to the 2000–01 FIBA SuproLeague season, when the competition was organized by FIBA.

Games played

Points scored (1,500+)

EuroLeague career statistical leaders 1958 to present
The EuroLeague's career statistical leaders, including all of the games played, under all of the league's formats and organizing bodies, from the 1958 FIBA European Champions Cup season to the present. Games played and total points scored are the two major statistical categories that have overlapping leaders from the two different eras of the competition, organized under both FIBA (1958 to 2001 SuproLeague) and the EuroLeague Commercial Assets (ECA) (2000 to present).

Bold indicates current club.

Games played

Points scored (3,500+)

Points scored (3,000+)

Points scored (2,500+)

Points scored (2,000+)

Last updated: March 3, 2023

References

External links
Official:
 
Official webTV 
Official store 

EuroLeague statistics